Monica Stefani (born 17 November 1957) is an Italian gymnast. She competed at the 1972 Summer Olympics.

References

External links
 

1957 births
Living people
Italian female artistic gymnasts
Olympic gymnasts of Italy
Gymnasts at the 1972 Summer Olympics
Sportspeople from Lucca